Jatropha unicostata is a species of plant in the family Euphorbiaceae. It is endemic to Socotra island Yemen. Its name in Soqotri is "sibru". Its natural habitat is subtropical or tropical dry forests.

References

Endemic flora of Socotra
unicostata
Least concern plants
Taxonomy articles created by Polbot
Plants described in 1884
Taxa named by Isaac Bayley Balfour